Gutkin is a surname. Notable people with the surname include:

Heinrich Gutkin (1879–1941), Estonian politician
Lev Gutkin (1914–2011), Russian scientist
Lisa Gutkin, American violinist, singer, and songwriter

See also
Gutkind